= Charlestown Veterans Memorial Park =

Park in Charlestown, Boston, Massachusetts, U.S.

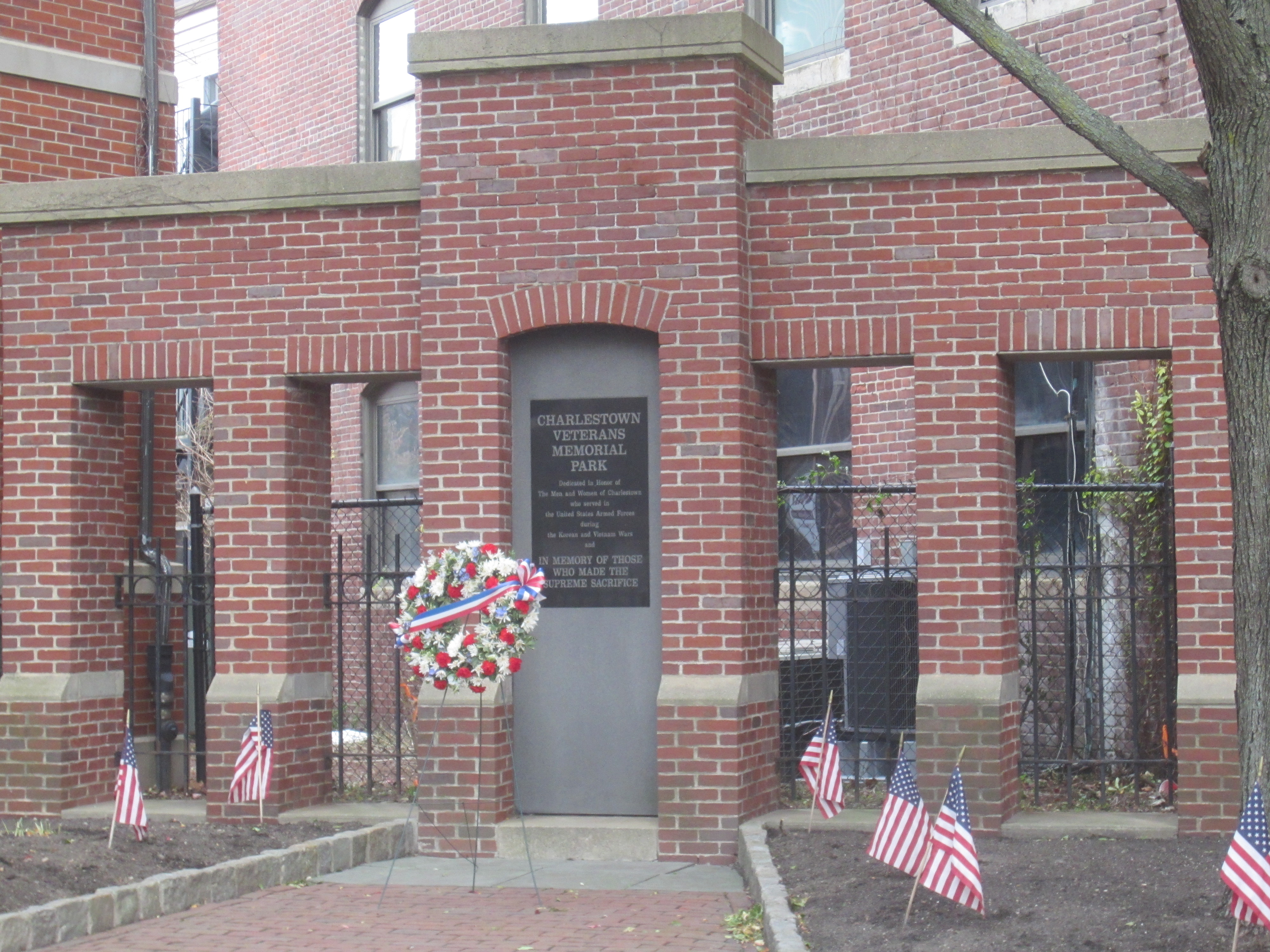
- The park in 2019
- Interactive map of Charlestown Veterans Memorial Park
- Location: Charlestown, Boston, Massachusetts, U.S.
- Coordinates: 42.37245°N 71.06178°W

Charlestown Veterans Memorial Park is a park in Charlestown, Boston, Massachusetts, United States. The park has memorials commemorating Korean War and Vietnam War veterans.

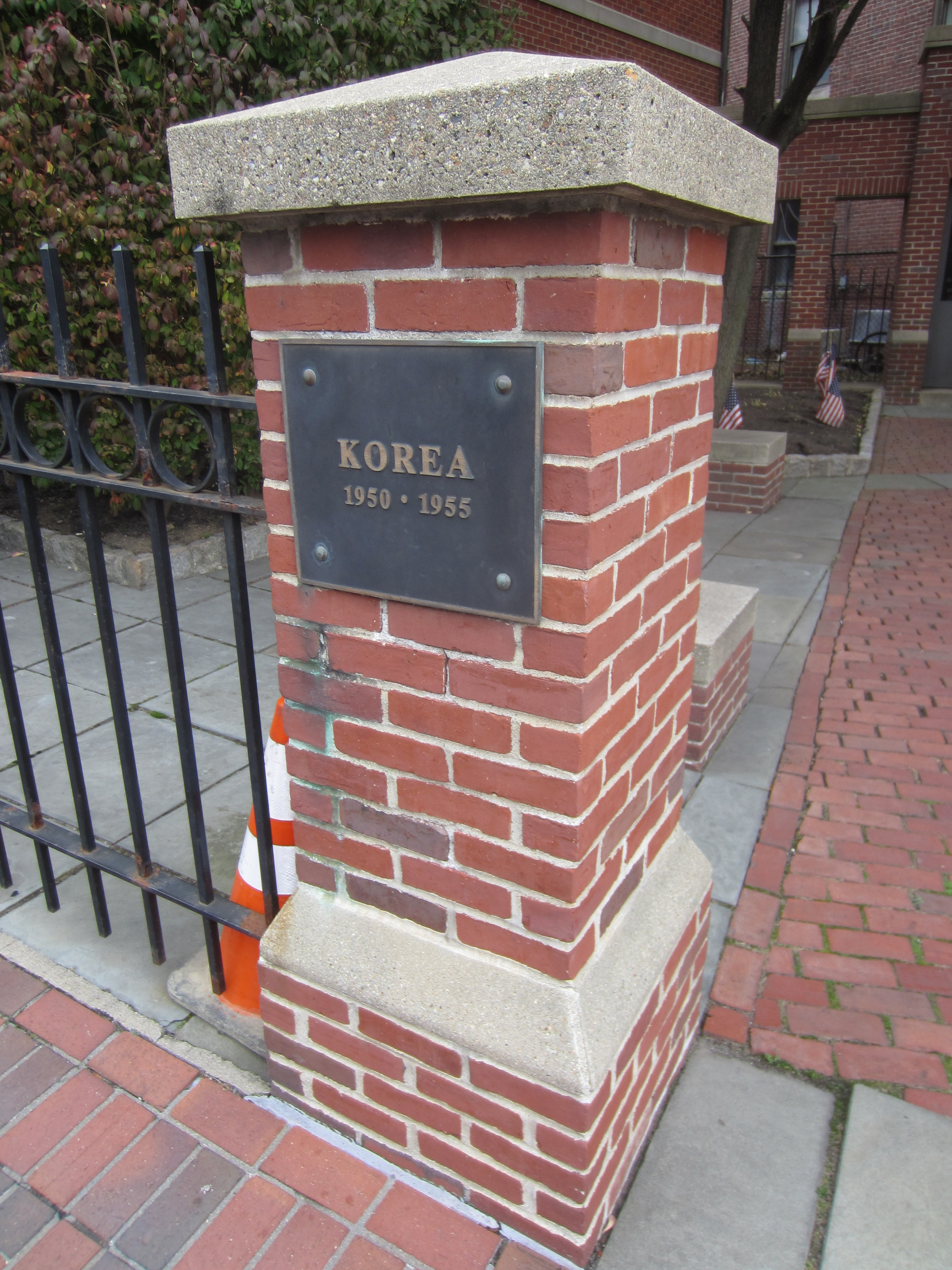
Plaque

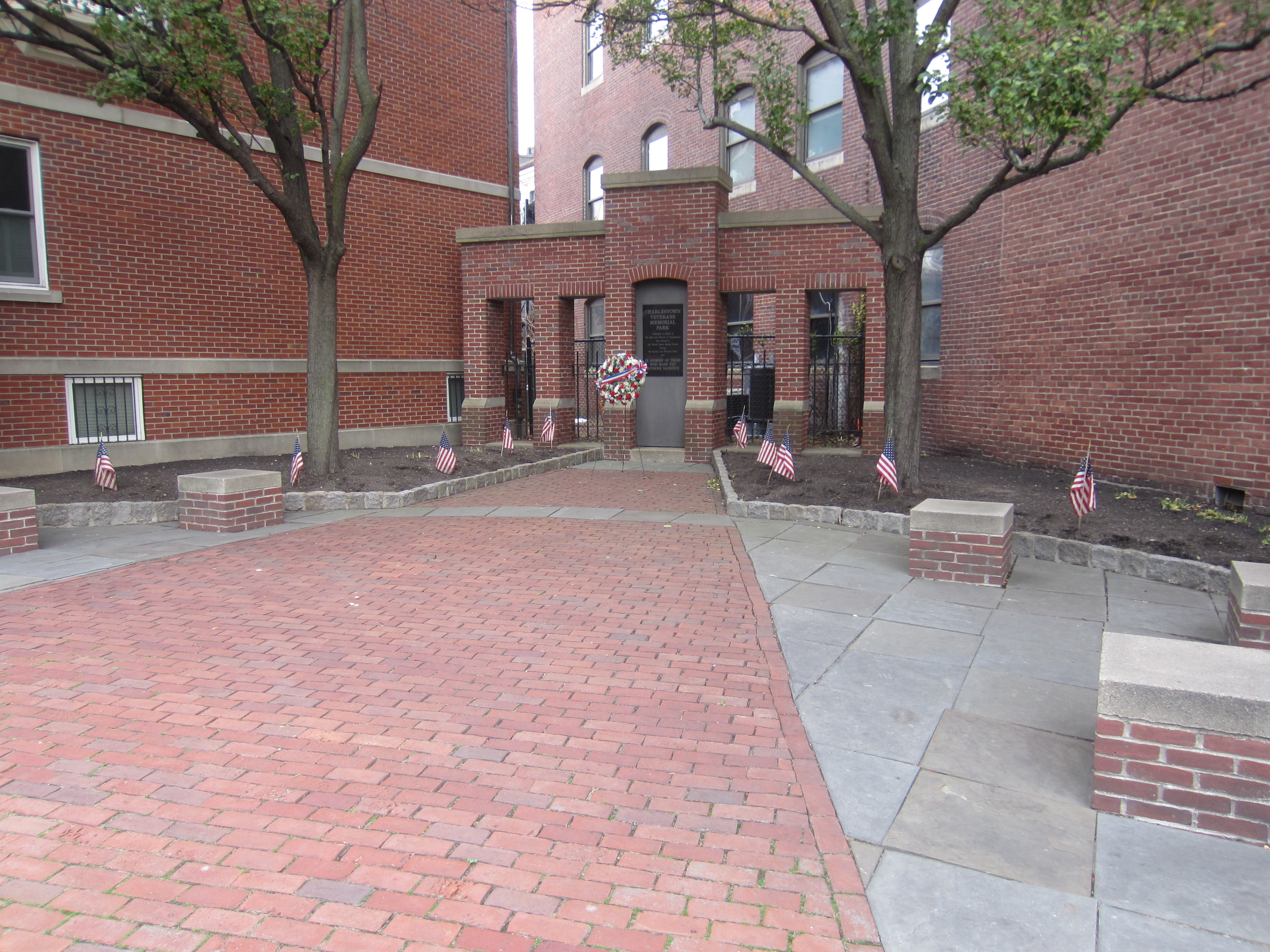
The park in 2019

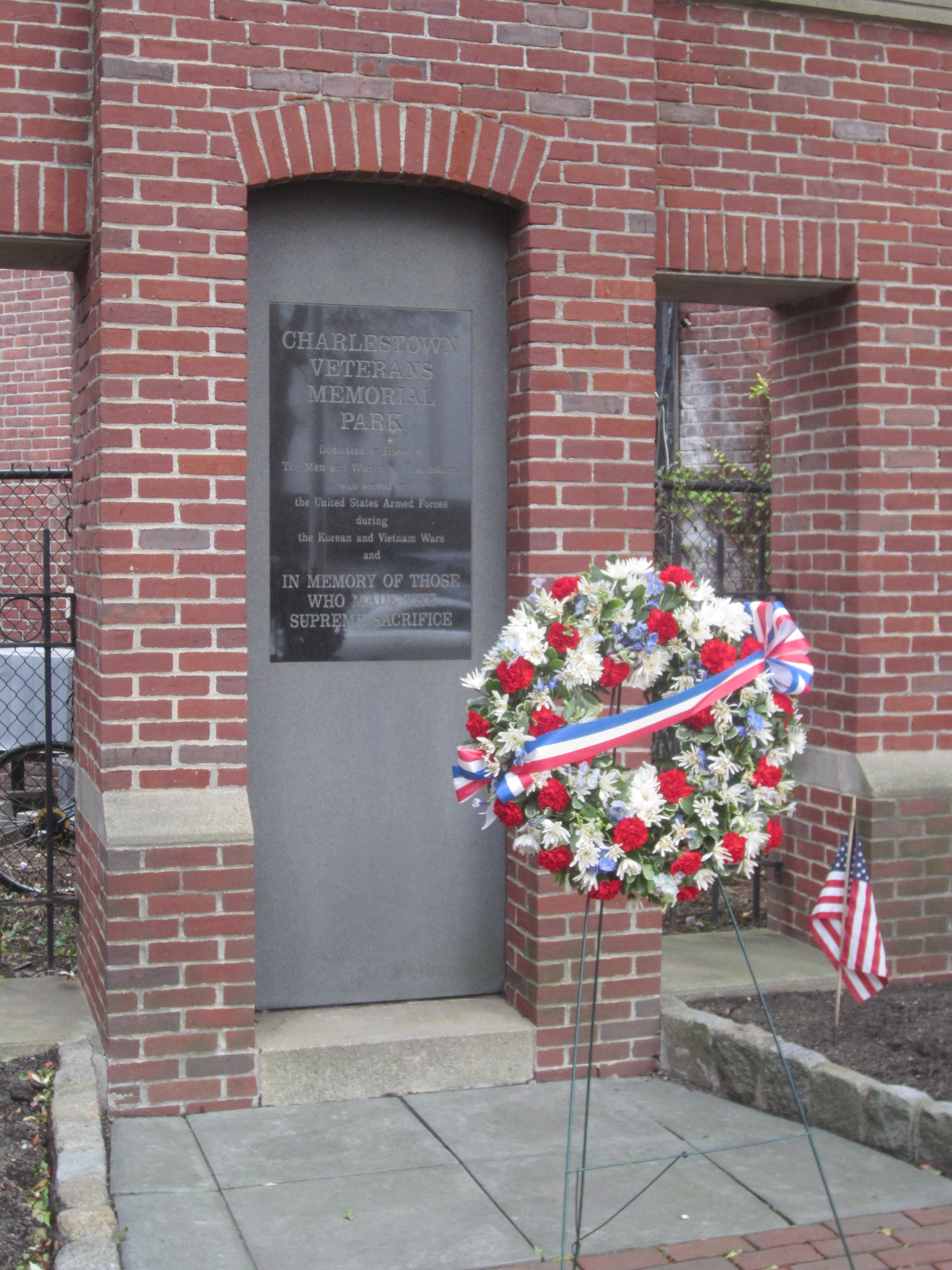
Memorial

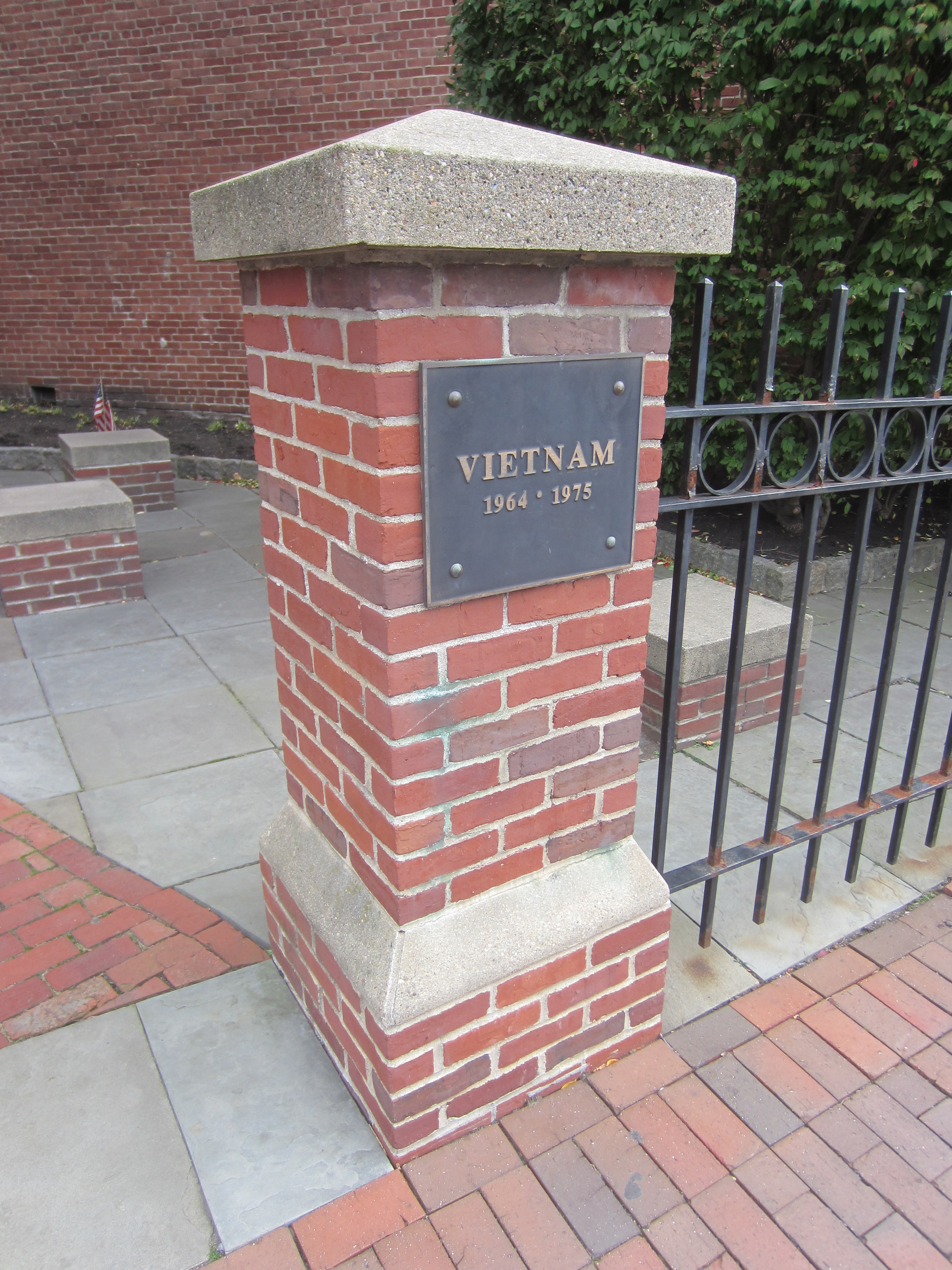
Plaque
